Justine Mara Andersen (born Dennis Cramer) is an American artist whose work has appeared in role-playing games and comic books.

Works
Justine Mara Andersen, has produced interior illustrations for many Dungeons & Dragons books and Dragon magazine since 1995, such as Player's Option: Spells & Magic (1996), The Sunless Citadel (2000), and the 3rd edition Fiend Folio (2003).

Andersen also created the erotic comic Mara of the Celts from Eros Comix.

Personal life
Justine Mara Andersen is a transgender woman, and before coming out mainly published works under birth name Dennis Cramer and pseudonym Dennis Crabapple McClain.

References

External links

Personal website

American artists
Living people
Role-playing game artists
Transgender artists
Year of birth missing (living people)